Claudio Silveira Silva (1939–2007) was a Uruguayan artist, writer and sculptor.

Life
Silva had a Brazilian father and a Uruguayan mother. He spent his early life in Montevideo, where his family had moved after his birth. He studied painting and etching at the National School of Fine Arts, and earned a scholarship in Paris to the Ecole Supérieure des Beaux-Arts for exhibiting his printing abilities in the city. From 1974 until his death in 2007, he took up wood sculpting in a range of ductility. He taught drawing classes and ran a plastic sculpting workshop in Durazno, Uruguay.

Notable work

Art
San Ramón Nonato - Nuestra Señora del Luján and Santa Isabel de Cardona Church, Soriano. Made with wood and metal inlays.
Untitled Statue of Christ - San Pedro de Durazno Church, Durazno.

Literature
El gato: Cuento en grabado madera - with Mario Arregui, 1967
Yunta brava - with Julio C. da Rosa, 1990
D'Uruguai a Mataró - in collaboration with the Mataró Museum, 1999
Nuestro campo: en dos visiones - with Raúl Iturria, 2007

References

This article was initially translated from the Spanish Wikipedia.

1939 births
2007 deaths
People from Río Branco, Uruguay
Uruguayan people of Portuguese descent
Uruguayan sculptors
Male sculptors
20th-century sculptors
Uruguayan male artists